Benjamin J. "Ben" Allen (born March 13, 1978) is an American attorney and Democratic politician. He has been a California state senator representing the 26th district since 2015. He previously served as University of California Student Regent and Santa Monica-Malibu Unified School District school board member.

Personal life and education
Allen was born to a Jewish family and raised in Santa Monica, California. From 2003 through 2005, Allen worked for Congressman Jose Serrano.  Allen obtained an undergraduate degree from Harvard University in 2000, a master's degree from the University of Cambridge in 2001, a JD from the UC Berkeley School of Law in 2008, and was admitted to the California State Bar in December 2008.
Allen is, as of 2019, a lecturer in law at UCLA School of Law and a private attorney. He lives in Santa Monica.

Political career
While at Berkeley, Allen served as UC Student Regent-designate from 2006 to 2007 and as Student Regent from 2007 to 2008. Prior to his election to the State Senate, Allen was a member of the Santa Monica-Malibu Unified School District Board of Education and chair of the Los Angeles County Committee on School Board Organization. Allen was first elected to the Santa Monica-Malibu Unified School District Board in 2008 and re-elected in 2012. He served as president of the school board from 2012-2013.

State senate
Allen announced his candidacy for the redrawn 26th district in February 2014.  His major opponents in the primary included Manhattan Beach Mayor Amy Howorth, former Assemblymember Betsy Butler, and social justice attorney Sandra Fluke.

After finishing in first place in the June 2014 primary election, he defeated Sandra Fluke in the November 2014 general election by a wide margin.

Ben Allen successfully defended his seat four years later. He secured 77 percent of the vote in the June 2018 primary, defeating Baron Bruno, an unaffiliated realtor, and Mark Matthew Herd, Libertarian candidate and Westwood neighborhood councilman. In the November 2018 primary election, Allen defeated Bruno again, winning by a margin of 54.4 percent. His current term ends on December 4, 2022.

References

External links
 
 2014 campaign website
 Join California Ben Allen
 

Democratic Party California state senators
Jewish American state legislators in California
1978 births
Living people
People from Santa Monica, California
School board members in California
Harvard University alumni
UC Berkeley School of Law alumni
University of California regents
UCLA School of Law faculty
21st-century American politicians
21st-century American Jews